Pleospora tarda is a plant pathogen infecting several hosts including alfalfa, red clover, peanut, soybean, lentils, beet, tomato, lettuce, hemp and carnations.

See also
 List of soybean diseases

References

External links
 Index Fungorum
 USDA ARS Fungal Database

Fungal plant pathogens and diseases
Pulse crop diseases
Tomato diseases
Lettuce diseases
Hemp diseases
Ornamental plant pathogens and diseases
Pleosporaceae
Soybean diseases
Fungi described in 1833